Alexander Douglas Smith (known as Alec Smith; 25 May 1949 – 19 January 2006) was a Zimbabwe National Army chaplain and son of Rhodesian Prime Minister Ian Smith.

His father Ian Smith had married Janet Watt in late-1948, after returning from war service with a facial disfigurement resulting from crashing his Hurricane whilst taking off from an airfield in Egypt. Watt was a South African school teacher who had previously been married to Piet Duvenage, a South African who had died as the result of a sporting accident while playing rugby. At the time Watt met Smith, she was struggling to support herself and two young children on a modest teacher's salary.

Ian Smith adopted Watt's two children, Robert and Jean, from her earlier marriage and brought them up, as his own, with Alec. Alec's relations with his mother were always more difficult than those he had with his father.

Early life and education
Smith grew up on the  family farm in Selukwe (now Shurugwi), a small mining and farming town with a population in the 1950s of around 8,500 (8,000 Black and 500 White). 

In April 1964, one month shy of his fifteenth birthday, Smith's father became Prime Minister of Southern Rhodesia. The younger Smith later suggested that this had caused his family life to suffer. He attended Chaplin High School, and in 1970, Smith began studying law at Rhodes University in South Africa. On his own for the first time, he became increasingly alienated from his background and neglected his studies in favour of partying, alcohol, and drugs. Smith first came to public attention at this time by applying for a British passport while declaring that he did not agree with his father's political views and still considered himself a loyal British subject. 

He was expelled from university at the end of his first year in 1971. Whilst returning from a subsequent holiday in Portuguese-ruled Mozambique, Smith was found to be in possession of 200 grams of cannabis by the South African authorities. He was convicted of drug trafficking, fined and given a suspended prison sentence.

Returning to Rhodesia, Smith held a number of odd jobs. He also served without distinction as a conscript in the Rhodesian Security Forces. Smith's lifestyle continued to be exuberant and this did not impress his conservative, church-going parents. However, at no time did they disown him.

In 1972, Smith claimed to have become a born-again Christian, declaring that God had freed him from his past debauchery and helped him see the injustice of racial discrimination. He aligned himself with the Moral Rearmament group, held public meetings promoting majority rule, and befriended a number of Black nationalist leaders.

Life abroad

By 1976, the Rhodesian Bush War was escalating and many White soldiers were recalled to active duty. Smith was called up, but declined to serve and relocated overseas to London. His half-brother Robert, similarly alienated from Rhodesian politics, had been living in the United Kingdom since 1970. The elder Smith seemed to accept his son's decision and the two remained in regular contact via letter and telephone.

Whilst living in London, Smith met Elisabeth Knudsen, an exchange student from Norway. The couple eventually married in Oslo, in June 1979, but his parents were not in attendance at the ceremony. Smith had invited his parents to attend the wedding and though his father was anxious to do so, he was denied an entry permit by the Norwegian government. Ian Smith later related considerable bitterness over the refusal of the international community to recognise Rhodesia, and described the Norway incident as 'the final straw'. Following an attempt at power-sharing with Abel Muzorewa as Prime Minister, under which the territory was renamed Zimbabwe Rhodesia, the territory finally achieved recognition as Zimbabwe in early-1980.

Life in Zimbabwe
Smith finally returned to Zimbabwe between December 1979 and March 1980. He remained ostracised by some White Zimbabweans who considered him a traitor, and more than a few Black Zimbabweans who refused to accept him due to his family. However, he and Elisabeth settled into an otherwise mundane family life, reconciling with his father.

During the 1980s and early-1990s, Smith held a number of jobs including, from 1991 to 1996, managing director of a professional football team, the Black Aces. Although not an ordained priest, he became a reserve chaplain in the new Zimbabwe National Army. Alec and Elisabeth Smith had three children – two daughters and one son. Ian Smith's family role as a grandfather offered him some solace after Janet's death in 1994.

Smith later became his father's business partner. In this capacity, he assisted in the editing of his father's memoirs and assumed the management of the family's agricultural interests, including the estate at Shurugwi. In 1984, he wrote a semi-autobiographical account of the struggle for majority rule in Rhodesia titled Now I Call Him Brother. It was claimed that the book was ghost-written for Alec by the professional writer Rebecca de Saintonge. The book was not rated highly in literary terms and included the following comments on the then Prime Minister of Zimbabwe, Robert Mugabe (p124) : "Mr Mugabe's Independence speech should have roused every Christian heart in the land. The whole tone of his talk was so Christian in content that every believer's heart should have been warmed by the thought that he was talking our language."

Political involvement
During the period 1975 to 1979, Rhodesia descended into an increasingly violent civil war between the white minority government and the two black nationalist armies, the Zimbabwe African National Liberation Army (ZANLA) and Zimbabwe People's Revolutionary Army (ZIPRA).

"The war was both bloody and brutal and brought out the very worst in the opposing combatants on all three sides," Mike Subritzky (former NZ Army ceasefire monitor in Rhodesia, 1980)

The Christian Moral Rearmament (MRA) group became active in trying to bring the conflict to an end. MRA seeks to secure social reform through personal reform and, to this end, promotes relationships between people on different sides in conflict situations. Smith was a prominent member of MRA. The black nationalist party ZANU-PF won the 1980 election outright, but elements in the white ruling class were plotting a military coup (Operation Quartz) to prevent it from taking control of the government.

MRA members sought to prevent a renewal of the war and determined that the only way to do this was to broker a face-to-face meeting between Robert Mugabe (leader of ZANU-PF) and Ian Smith. MRA member Joram Kucherera (a senior civil servant) used contacts inside ZANU-PF to approach Mugabe while Alec Smith approached his father Ian. Eventually, a meeting was arranged. Ian Smith went to Robert Mugabe's house, on the night of 3/4 March 1980, accompanied only by Kucherera. The meeting lasted several hours and was surprisingly friendly. The matter was settled – Ian Smith accepted the verdict of the election while Mugabe agreed to continued white participation in the government and administration. 
 
Alec Smith took no further role in politics, although he remained active in community issues through the development of sport. It is believed that he declined an invitation to participate in the Movement for Democratic Change in the late 1990s.

Death
In December 2005, Smith travelled to Norway with his wife Elisabeth in order to join her relatives for Christmas. On 19 January 2006, the couple started the journey back to Zimbabwe via London. Whilst in the transit lounge at Heathrow Airport, Smith suddenly suffered a heart attack and died almost instantly. He had previously been in good health. His body was later returned to Norway for cremation whilst a memorial service was held at the Anglican cathedral in Harare.

The family assigned the Smiths' eldest daughter, Inger, to break the news to his father. The latter had suffered a fall the previous year and had been obliged to live with his widowed stepdaughter, Jean Tholet, in Cape Town. Ian Smith was reported to have been devastated by the news and not to have recovered from it either mentally or physically.

Alec Smith was described by someone who knew him later in his life as follows:

"... a pale, slow-walking, slow-talking man with watery eyes and a gentle sense of humour. There was nothing overtly animated about him. He was a will- o'-the-wisp: you never knew quite where he'd come from or where he was going."  Rebecca de Saintonge, The Independent, 2 February 2006

References

1949 births
2006 deaths
Zimbabwean people of British descent
White Rhodesian people
People from Gweru
Rhodesian military personnel
Rhodes University alumni
Alumni of Chaplin High School
Ian Smith